The Vivanco–Pareja Treaty was a treaty between Peru and Spain, signifying cooperation between the two nations during the Chincha Islands War. It was signed on January 27, 1865, on board the frigate Villa de Madrid, by Manuel Ignacio de Vivanco (on behalf of Peruvian President Juan Antonio Pezet) and José Manuel Pareja (on behalf of Spanish Prime Minister Ramón María Narváez).

As a consequence, on November 7, 1865, because of his unwillingness to declare war against Spain and his discredit for having signed the treaty, Peruvian President Juan Antonio Pezet was forced out of office and replaced by his vice president, General Pedro Diez Canseco.

References

 The Hispanic American Historical Review, Volume 1 : James Alexander Robertson

Treaties of Peru
1865 treaties
Treaties of the Spanish Empire
Peru–Spain relations